Lukáš Provod (born 23 October 1996) is a Czech football player who plays for Slavia Prague, as a left winger.

Club career
He made his Czech National Football League debut for Baník Sokolov on 6 August 2016 in a game against Vlašim.

On 3 September 2019 Slavia Prague confirmed, that Provod had arrived on loan from Viktoria Plzeň and that the deal would turn into a permanent deal from the new year.

International career 
Provod scored his first international goal in Czech Republic's 2022 FIFA World Cup qualification match against Belgium on 27 March 2021.

Career statistics

Club

International goals

Honours

Club
České Budějovice
Czech National League: 2018–19
Slavia Prague
Czech First League: 2019–20, 2020–21
Czech Cup: 2020–21

Individual
UEFA Europa League Squad of the Season: 2020–21
Czech First League Player of the Year: 2020–21
Czech First League Midfielder of the Year: 2020–21

References

External links
 

1996 births
Living people
Sportspeople from Plzeň
Czech footballers
Czech Republic international footballers
Czech Republic youth international footballers
Czech Republic under-21 international footballers
FK Baník Sokolov players
SK Dynamo České Budějovice players
SK Slavia Prague players
Czech First League players
Czech National Football League players
Association football forwards